The 1973 Rwandan coup d'état, also known as the Coup d'état of 5 July, was a military coup staged by Juvénal Habyarimana against incumbent president Grégoire Kayibanda in the Republic of Rwanda. The coup took place on 5 July 1973 and was considered by many as a betrayal.

Background 
While still under Belgian rule in the 1950s and early 1960s, resentment towards colonial rule and the ethnic Tutsi elite among the Hutu had increased, and led to the formation of the political party Parmehutu by Grégoire Kayibanda in 1957, with aims to overthrow the monarchy and gain identical rights ("emancipation") for the Hutus. This was achieved following the 1961 election and referendum, but the absence of effective Tutsi opposition led to regional tensions between Hutu politicians. The central and southern politicians were opposed by those from the north.

In the months prior to Habyarimana's coup, the Army (mainly composed by northern soldiers) had intensified persecution of ethnic Tutsi through the formation of Hutu vigilante committees to ensure enforcement of the required ethnic quotas requested by Habyarimana. Kayibanda refused this policy of quotas and was then described by the Army as a 'weak' leader. Fake rumors and documents were produced by the Army against the President and Rwanda became isolated economically and diplomatically, especially from neighbouring Uganda (then under the rule of Idi Amin) which housed large numbers of Tutsi. This situation was regarded by the majority of the population as a betrayal from Habyarimana. Indeed, prior to the coup Habyarimana, who served as Army Chief of Staff, was also a friend of president Kayibanda.

The coup d'état
On the morning of 5 July 1973, Juvénal Habyarimana with AML-60 armored cars and infantry from the Rwandan National guard, took over the government and put then-president Grégoire Kayibanda under house arrest. The next morning after the coup Habyarimana announced the Committee for Peace and National Union. The coup was completely successful and resulted in no lives lost however 56 people were arrested. After the coup, all 56 people that were arrested including former president Grégoire Kayibanda starved to death while in prison.

Aftermath 

Immediately after seizing power, Habyarimana established a totalitarian dictatorship and outlawed all political parties, but in 1974 created his own, the Mouvement Révolutionnaire National pour le Développement (MRND), as the country's only legally-allowed party.

While the coup itself was bloodless, fifty-six people – mostly former leaders – were killed by the security services between 1974 and 1977, with Kayibanda dying in detention in 1976, probably of starvation.

Notes

References

External links
Renversement du gouvernement de Grégoire Kayibanda au Rwanda, 1973 at Université de Sherbrooke

Rwandan coup d'etat
Military coups in Rwanda
1973 in Rwanda
July 1973 events in Africa
1970s coups d'état and coup attempts